Hotazel is a town in John Taolo Gaetsewe District Municipality in the Northern Cape province of South Africa.

The town serves the manganese mines, 147 km (91 mi) north of Postmasburg and 46 km (28.6 mi) north-west of Kuruman. It takes its name from the farm on which it was laid out; a pun on 'hot as hell', referring to the weather when the farm was surveyed and the generally torrid climate surrounding the area.

References

Populated places in the Joe Morolong Local Municipality